Florian Fulland (born 15 September 1984) is a German former footballer.

Coaching career

SC Paderborn
After returning to SC Paderborn 07 as a player, Fulland was involved in the club's youth development work as a sports director for various age groups. For a time, he was promoted to head of the youth development center and from March 2016, he also coached the club's U19 team. On 24 October 2016, he was promoted to the first team staff as an assistant coach to René Müller, following the departure of assistant Markus Feldhoff, who had moved to SV Werder Bremen. However, he remained in charge of the U19s.

On 21 November 2016, Fulland was announced as the interim replacement for René Müller at Paderborn, as the club were struggling. He managed two 3. Liga matches, with a record of one draw and one loss and was replaced on 6 December 2016. After being replaced, he returned to coach the U19s. In June 2018, Fulland stepped down from his post.

VfL Osnabrück
Ahead of the 2019-20 season, Fulland was appointed U19 manager at VfL Osnabrück. 

After Marco Grote was dismissed as head coach of the second-division club in February 2021, Fulland was named interim coach for VfL Osnabrück on 15 February 2021. After Markus Feldhoff was hired as the new head coach on 3 March 2021, Fulland continued as a part of the first team staff as an assistant coach and also as U19 manager.

Fulland announced his departure from Osnabrück on 7 October 2021.

Arminia Bielefeld
On 7 October 2021, Fulland was presented as the new U19 manager of Arminia Bielefeld.

References

External links

1984 births
Living people
People from Detmold
Sportspeople from Detmold (region)
German footballers
Association football defenders
SC Paderborn 07 players
German football managers
3. Liga managers
SC Paderborn 07 managers
VfL Osnabrück managers
Footballers from North Rhine-Westphalia
2. Bundesliga managers
21st-century German people